= List of Suzuki vehicles =

List of Suzuki vehicles cover vehicles produced by Suzuki in past and present.
